Marie Louise Anna of Prussia (1 March 1829, Berlin – 10 May 1901, Frankfurt am Main) was a Prussian princess of the House of Hohenzollern.

Early life
She was the second child and eldest daughter of Prince Charles of Prussia and Princess Marie of Saxe-Weimar-Eisenach. Her paternal grandfather was King Frederick William III of Prussia.

Marriage
There were failed negotiations for a marriage between her and King Charles XV of Sweden. On 27 June 1854 she married Alexis, Landgrave of Hesse-Philippsthal-Barchfeld at Charlottenburg Palace. The marriage remained childless and ended with a divorce on 6 March 1861.

Ancestry

References

1829 births
1901 deaths
Prussian princesses